Facundo Monteseirín  (born 12 March 1995) is an Argentine professional footballer who plays as a centre-back for Nueva Chicago.

Honours

Argentina U20
South American Youth Football Championship: 2015

External links

References

1995 births
Living people
Argentine footballers
Argentina under-20 international footballers
Association football defenders
People from Neuquén Province
Club Atlético Lanús footballers
Arsenal de Sarandí footballers
San Martín de San Juan footballers
Club Atlético Tigre footballers
Nueva Chicago footballers
Argentine Primera División players
Primera Nacional players